Yosef Gorny (Hebrew: יוסף גורני) (born 1933), is  Professor of Study of Zionism and head of the Zionist Research Institute at the Tel Aviv University. He is a former head of the Weizmann Institute for the Study of Zionism, at the same university.

Published works
(Selective and incomplete)
Zionism and the Arabs, 1882-1948: a study of Ideology, Oxford University Press, 1987, 
State of Israel in Jewish Public Thought: The Quest for Collective Identity 1994, 
Between Auschwitz and Jerusalem: Jewish Collective Identity in Crisis, 2003,

Awards
 In 2006, Gorny was a co-recipient (with Chava Turniansky) of the Bialik Prize for Jewish thought.

See also
List of Bialik Prize recipients

References

External links
 "Yosef Gorny: Zionism and the Arabs", Dave's Middle East Study Group

Israeli Jews
Israeli historians
Jewish historians
Academic staff of Tel Aviv University
Living people
1933 births